The Real Bruce Lee, also known as Last Fist of Fury, is a 1977 martial arts documentary.

The version of the film that is commonly distributed in the West (USA) on public domain-type DVD and video labels runs 93 minutes in length. The British VHS-version released in 1979 runs 118 minutes.

Plot
It begins with a brief biography of Bruce Lee, and shows scenes from four of his childhood films, Bad Boy, Orphan Sam, Kid Cheung, and The Carnival, each sepia-toned and given a fully new soundtrack with dubbed English dialogue and a disco soundtrack such as an instrumental version of Devil's Gun by C. J. & Company.

Next, there is a three-minute highlight reel of Lee imitator Bruce Li.

Finally, there is a feature-length Korean martial arts film titled 최후의 정무문, Choihui Jeongmumun (lit. "Last Fist of Fury"). The film is a spinoff of the Bruce Lee film Fist of Fury (1972) in which Japan has invaded China and started putting shame to the glorious past of the House of the Dragon kung-fu school. When they kill one of the pupils in an uneven match, a fellow fighter named Yǒu Lóng (龙友) who is also from the school has put his own life at risk after swearing to avenge his murdered kung-fu brother against every last foreign oppressor from Japan. The film stars another Bruce Lee imitator known as Dragon Lee.

Sequel
In 2004, The Real Bruce Lee 2 was released.

References

External links 
 
 

1977 films
1977 martial arts films
1970s martial arts films
Documentary films about sportspeople
Bruceploitation films
Kung fu films
Hong Kong martial arts films
1970s Hong Kong films
1980s Hong Kong films